The LARC-LX (Lighter, Amphibious Resupply, Cargo, 60 ton), originally designated as BARC (Barge, Amphibious Resupply, Cargo) is a welded steel-hulled amphibious cargo vehicle.

Description

It could carry up to 100 tons of cargo or 200 people, but a more typical load was 60 tons of cargo or 120 people. The vehicle was powered by four  GMC diesel engines positioned in the sides of the hull, each of which drove one wheel on land. Pairs of engines were coupled to drive each of the two -diameter propellers, which propelled the vehicle in the water. The operator occupied a small cab on the port side at the aft end of the vehicle.

The LARC-LX was used to transport wheeled and tracked vehicles, including beach preparation equipment and general cargo, from ship-to-shore or to inland transfer points. It was also capable of transporting  shipping containers, which could be landed from the LARC either by crane, straddle carriers, or rollers. It was the only amphibious vehicle in U.S. Army service capable of landing on a beach through surf. Typically, the LARC-LX was carried as deck cargo on a commercial vessel or heavy lift ship to be transported overseas. Surviving examples of the LARC-LX can be found at the Overloon War Museum in the Netherlands, the Military Museum of North Florida in Green Cove Springs, Florida, the Lane Motor Museum in Nashville, Tennessee, and the US Army Transportation Museum at Ft. Eustis, VA.

Service
The first BARC had its maiden voyage in 1952 at Fort Lawton, Washington. The designation was changed from BARC to LARC in 1960. The LARCs first saw active service in 1967 when they were dispatched to South Vietnam to support the 101st Airborne Division, and in 1968 the 1st Cavalry Division. The last LARC-LX vehicles were retired from service in 2001.

Specifications
Crew: 5
Weight: 100 tons
Engine: GM 6-71, 265 hp × 4
Range (land): 
Range (sea): 
Length: 
Width: 
Height: 19 ft, 6in
Wheelbase: 28 ft, 6 in
Battery: 24 volt
Speed (water)
Forward (empty): 
Forward (60 ton): 
Forward (100 ton): 
Speed (land)
Forward (empty): 
Forward (60 ton): 
Forward (100 ton): 
Reverse (60 ton): 
Turning circle: 75 ft (23 m)
Gradient: 60%
Temperature range: 125 F to -25 F (-30 to +50 °C)

See also
 LARC-V – Lighter, Amphibious Resupply, Cargo, 5 ton – an aluminium-hulled vehicle.
 LARC-XV – Lighter, Amphibious Resupply, Cargo, 15 ton – an aluminium-hulled amphibious cargo vehicle.

External links

 LARC-LX at GlobalSecurity.org

Wheeled amphibious vehicles
Military vehicles of the United States
Military vehicles introduced in the 1950s